Corridos de Muerte (Tales of Death) is the debut album by deathgrind band Asesino, first released in 2002. It was re-released in 2005 with a bonus DVD.

The opening sample of "Asesino" comes from the Spanish movie The Day of the Beast, while the 'execution' sound effect at the end of "La Ejecución" was taken from The Green Mile.

Track listing

Personnel
Asesino (Dino Cazares) – guitars, production
Maldito X (Tony Campos) – bass, vocals
Greñudo (Raymond Herrera) – drums

Asesino albums
2002 albums